Angel Acuña Lizaña (11 February 1919 – 1 August 1997) was a Mexican basketball player. He competed in the 1948 Summer Olympics.

References

1919 births
1997 deaths
Basketball players at the 1948 Summer Olympics
Mexican men's basketball players
Olympic basketball players of Mexico
People from Chihuahua City
Basketball players from Chihuahua
Mexican expatriates in the United States